Speyerbrunn is a community of the municipality Elmstein in the Landkreis of Bad Dürkheim in Rhineland-Palatinate, Germany

Location 

History 
Speyerbrunn was founded in 1754.  Until 1975 the town belonged to the municipality Wilgartswiesen, which was merged with the neighboring towns Schwarzenbach, Erlenbach and  Elmstein in a local government reform on January 1, 1976.

Bad Dürkheim (district)